The 2006 Metro Atlantic Athletic Conference baseball tournament took place from May 25 through 27, 2006. The top four regular season finishers of the league's teams met in the double-elimination tournament held at Dutchess Stadium in Wappingers Falls, New York.  won their first tournament championship and earned the conference's automatic bid to the 2006 NCAA Division I baseball tournament.

Seeding 
The top four teams were seeded one through four based on their conference winning percentage. They then played a double-elimination tournament.

Results

All-Tournament Team 
The following players were named to the All-Tournament Team.

Most Valuable Player 
Eric Nieto was named Tournament Most Outstanding Player. Nieto was an outfielder for Manhattan.

References 

Tournament
Metro Atlantic Athletic Conference Baseball Tournament
Metro Atlantic Athletic Conference baseball tournament